Tash (born Sertac Nidai) is a British-Turkish Cypriot singer whose music is an "East-meets-West" fusion of R&B and Middle Eastern influences. He is the first artist signed to the Sony Music Middle East on a full record deal. Tash released his debut album, "In The Deep", in 2012 with his lead single "Habibi Leh"; the album heavily trades on Tash's Turkish Cypriot roots.

Biography
Tash was born Sertac Nidai in London, the United Kingdom, to Turkish Cypriot parents. His parents introduced him to different kinds of music at a very young age when they would bring home CDs from their travels. One of his earliest memories, at age five, is around owning a mini snooker table where instead of playing, he would grab the sticks and make rhythmic beats on the cushions. Tash has described himself as "quite academic, I wouldn’t say I was that sporty though. I’d usually be in the music block, especially during subjects I didn’t like!". He began playing the piano at primary school, which is now one of his main instruments, as well as the darbuka. In 2011, during a London video shoot, Tash was introduced to a Sony Music official, he became the first artist signed to the Sony Music Middle East on a full record deal. His debut album, "In The Deep", was released on 12 February 2012.

Discography

Albums
 In The Deep (2012)

Singles
 Habibi Leh ft. D.A. (2012)
 Habibi Leh (Losing My Head) ft. D.A. (2012)

References

Living people
Turkish Cypriot musicians
Singers from London
British people of Turkish Cypriot descent
Year of birth missing (living people)